Lissy María Sánchez Guzmán (born 5 December 1995) is a Dominican footballer who plays as a defender for Cibao FC and the Dominican Republic women's national team.

International career
Sánchez represented the Dominican Republic at two CONCACAF Women's U-17 Championship qualifying stages (2010 and 2012) and the 2012 CONCACAF Women's U-20 Championship qualifying. At senior level, she capped during the 2010 CONCACAF Women's World Cup Qualifying qualification, the 2012 CONCACAF Women's Olympic Qualifying Tournament (and its qualifying), the 2014 Central American and Caribbean Games and the 2020 CONCACAF Women's Olympic Qualifying Championship qualification.

References 

1995 births
Living people
People from El Seibo Province
Dominican Republic women's footballers
Women's association football defenders
Cibao FC players
Dominican Republic women's international footballers
Competitors at the 2014 Central American and Caribbean Games